Federal Route 61, or Jalan Alor Gajah–Tampin or Jalan Dato' Mohd Zin on Malacca side, is a federal road in Malacca and Negeri Sembilan state, Malaysia. The road connects Alor Gajah in the south to Tampin in the north. The road is named after former Melaka Chief Minister, Mohd Zin Abdul Ghani.

Route background
The Kilometre Zero of the Federal Route 61 starts at Tampin, Negeri Sembilan.

Features
At most sections, the Federal Route 61 was built under the JKR R5 road standard, allowing maximum speed limit of up to 90 km/h.

There are no overlaps, or sections with motorcycle lanes.

There is one alternate route: Pulau Sebang–Tampin: Tampin Bypass (see below).

List of junctions and towns

Tampin Bypass

References

Malaysian Federal Roads